Pinery may refer to:
 Pinery Provincial Park in Ontario, Canada
 Pineapple pit, sometimes referred to as a pinery
 Pinery Station in Texas
 Pinery, South Australia, a locality between Mallala and Balaklava